is a passenger railway station in located in the city of Tsu,  Mie Prefecture, Japan, operated by the private railway operator Kintetsu Railway.

Lines
Shiratsuka Station is served by the Nagoya Line, and is located 61.7 rail kilometers from the starting point of the line at Kintetsu Nagoya Station.

Station layout

The station consists of two island platforms serving four tracks, connecting with a level crossing to and from the station building in the south-east of Ise-Nakagawa-bound platform. Shiratsuka Depot is located in the area of the station.

Platforms

Adjacent stations

History
Shiratsuka Station opened on May 8, 1944 as a station on Kansai Express Railway's Nagoya Line. This line was merged with the Nankai Electric Railway on June 1, 1944 to form Kintetsu.

Passenger statistics
In fiscal 2019, the station was used by an average of 839 passengers daily (boarding passengers only).

Surrounding area
Shiratsuka Civic Center
Asahi Denki Kogyo

See also
List of railway stations in Japan

References

External links

 Kintetsu: Shiratsuka Station

Railway stations in Japan opened in 1944
Railway stations in Mie Prefecture
Stations of Kintetsu Railway
Tsu, Mie